The Third Fleet comprised 11 ships that set sail from the Kingdom of Great Britain in February, March and April 1791, bound for the Sydney penal settlement, with more than 2,000 convicts aboard. The passengers comprised convicts, military personnel and notable people sent to fill high positions in the colony. More important for the fledgling colony was that the ships also carried provisions.

The first ship to arrive in Sydney was the Mary Ann with its cargo of female convicts and provisions on 9 July 1791. Mary Ann had sailed on her own to Sydney Cove, and there is some argument about whether she was the last ship of the Second Fleet, or the first ship of the Third Fleet, or simply sailing independently, as was HMS Gorgon. The vessels that unambiguously belong to the third fleet all left together.

The ships that make up each fleet, however, are decided from the viewpoint of the settlers in Sydney Cove. For them, the second set of ships arrived in 1790 (June), and the third set of ships arrived in 1791 (July–October). The Mary Ann was a 1791 arrival.

With Matilda came news that there were another nine ships making their way for Sydney, and which were expected to arrive shortly. The final vessel, Admiral Barrington, did not arrive until 16 October, nearly 11 weeks after Matilda, and 14 weeks after Mary Ann.

Ships of the Third Fleet

Atlantic, Salamander, and William and Ann departed from Plymouth; their naval agent was Lieutenant Richard Bowen. Albemarle, Active, Admiral Barrington, Britannia, and Matilda departed from Portsmouth; their naval agent was Lieutenant Robert Parry Young. Queen departed from Cork, Ireland; she had her own naval agent, Lieutenant Samuel Blow.

After having delivered their convicts, Active, Admiral Barrington, Albemarle, and Queen sailed for India. French privateers captured Active and Albemarle as they were almost home. Pirates murdered most of Admiral Barringtons crew near Bombay, but she was apparently recovered. A French privateer captured her in 1797.

Britannia, Mary Ann, Matilda, Salamander, and William and Ann went whaling. Britannia was wrecked off the coast of New South Wales some years later, in 1806. Matilda was wrecked on a shoal in February 1792.

People of the Third Fleet 
From the above table it can be seen that 173 male convicts and 9 female convicts died during this voyage. Though this death rate was high, it was nowhere near as high as that which occurred on the Second Fleet. Convict arrivals on the Third Fleet included:

Simeon Lord pioneer merchant and magistrate
Isaac Nichols first postmaster (1810)
Joseph Luker police officer
James Underwood shipbuilder

See also 

 First Fleet
 Fourth Fleet
 Penal transportation

References

External sources
 Bateson, Charles, The Convict Ships, 1787-1868, Sydney, 1974. 
 Hughes, Robert, The Fatal Shore, London, Pan, 1988 
 Keneally, Thomas (2006), A Commonwealth of Thieves, Sydney, Random House, 

Convictism in Australia
History of New South Wales
History of immigration to Australia
Maritime history of Australia